Ong Soon Hock (born 15 February 1985) is a badminton player from Malaysia.

Career 
As a junior player, Ong won the 2002 Asian Junior Championships gold medal in the boys' doubles event and bronze medal in the team event. At the World Junior Championships, he won the boys' doubles bronze. He also won the bronze medal at the 2005 Asian Championships. Together with Gan Teik Chai, Ong won some international tournament in Mauritius, Argentinal and Brazil.

Ong played at the 2007 BWF World Championships in men's doubles with Tan Bin Shen. They were seeded  16 and were defeated in the first round by Keita Masuda and Tadashi Ohtsuka, of Japan, 14–21, 8–21.

Ong's partner changed to Hoon Thien How. They participated in the 2008 Indonesia Open and reached the semi-finals before being beaten by Tony Gunawan and Candra Wijaya, 25–23, 15–21, 15–21. This was followed by a defeat to second-seeded Cai Yun and Fu Haifeng in the 2008 China Masters 15–21, 21–17, and 20–22.

In 2009, Ong and Hoon reached Vietnam Open final, but they lost to Indonesia's Luluk Hadiyanto and Joko Riyadi which were seeded 7 in straight sets, 19–21 and 20–22.

Achievements

Asian Championships 
Men's doubles

World Junior Championships 
Boys' doubles

Asian Junior Championships 
Boys' doubles

BWF Grand Prix 
The BWF Grand Prix had two levels, the BWF Grand Prix and Grand Prix Gold. It was a series of badminton tournaments sanctioned by the Badminton World Federation (BWF) which was held from 2007 to 2017.

Men's doubles

  BWF Grand Prix Gold tournament
  BWF Grand Prix tournament

BWF International Challenge/Series 
Men's doubles

  BWF International Challenge tournament
  BWF International Series tournament
  BWF Future Series tournament

References

External links 
 

1985 births
Living people
People from Selangor
Malaysian sportspeople of Chinese descent
Malaysian male badminton players
Competitors at the 2011 Southeast Asian Games
Southeast Asian Games silver medalists for Malaysia
Southeast Asian Games medalists in badminton
21st-century Malaysian people